Logsden is an unincorporated community in Lincoln County, Oregon, United States. Logsden has a post office with ZIP code 97357.

References

External links
Historic images of covered bridges in Logsden from Salem Public Library

Unincorporated communities in Lincoln County, Oregon
Unincorporated communities in Oregon